This is the list of cathedrals in Paraguay.

Roman Catholic 
Cathedrals of the Roman Catholic Church in Paraguay:

 Metropolitan Cathedral of Our Lady of the Assumption in Asunción
 Cathedral of St. Rose of Lima in Benjamin Aceval
 Catedral Nuestra Senora de los Milagros in Caacupe
 Cathedral of the Immaculate Conception of Mary in Carapeguá
 Cathedral of St. Blaise in [[
]]
 Cathedral of the Immaculate Conception of Mary in Concepción
 Cathedral of Our Lady of the Rosary in Coronel Oviedo
 Cathedral of the Incarnation in Encarnación
 Mary Help of Christians Cathedral, Fuerte Olimpo
 Cathedral of St. John the Baptist in San Juan Bautista de las Misiones
 Cathedral of St. Lawrence in San Lorenzo
 Cathedral of St. Peter in San Pedro de Ycuamandiyú
 St. Claire Cathedral, Villarrica

See also
List of cathedrals

References

Catholic Church in Paraguay
Cathedrals
Paraguay

Cathedrals